Sidi Bou Hadid Mosque, also known as the Sidi Amor small mosque  is a Tunisian mosque located in the north of the medina of Tunis.

Localization
The mosque is located in 50 the Pacha Street.

Etymology
The mosque got its name from the saint Sidi Bou Hadid, who lived in the 12th century AD who was buried in the Hara (the Jewish hood in the medina) near Bab Cartagena.

History
According to the historian Mohamed Belkhodja, the mosque was built years after Sidi Bou Hadid's death.

References 

Mosques in Tunis
19th-century mosques